Adwalton is a village in the City of Leeds metropolitan borough, West Yorkshire, England. It is in the BD11 (Bradford) postcode area. The population of the village at the 2011 Census was only limited. It is included in the Morley, West Yorkshire ward of Leeds City Council, and the Morley and Outwood UK parliamentary constituency.

It is notable as the site of the Battle of Adwalton Moor in 1643; an event of the First English Civil War.

Etymology
The name of the village is first attested in 1202, as Athelwaldon, and then in 1208 as Adwalton. The name derives from the Old English personal name Æthelwald and the word tūn ('farmstead, estate'). Thus the name originally meant 'Æthelwald's estate'.

References

External links 

 Battle of Adwalton Moor - History of War.org
 

Places in Leeds
Villages in West Yorkshire